Burntisland railway station is a railway station in the town of Burntisland, Fife, Scotland. The station is managed by ScotRail and is on the Fife Circle Line.

History
The station was designed by Grainger & Miller engineers.  Originally it was the southern terminus of the Edinburgh and Northern Railway, with tracks and trainshed stretching away behind the imposing terminus building.  The railway opened its main line north across Fife to Lindores &  (branch line) in September 1847. These were extended by the following summer to Hilton Junction, near Perth, and Tayport.  From Burntisland, a ferry service ran across the River Forth to Granton in the northern suburbs of Edinburgh, from where trains could be taken to various destinations across central and south-west Scotland. 

The current station, which bypasses the site of the original station, dates from 1890 when the Forth Rail Bridge and associated connecting lines were opened to provide a direct route across the Forth estuary to Edinburgh Waverley.

Accidents and incidents

On 14 April 1914, an express passenger train hauled by NBR H class locomotive 872 Auld Reekie was in collision with a freight train that was being shunted. The cause of the accident was an error by the signalman. Two people were killed.

Services
One of the latter then continues along the western side of the Fife Circle line back to Edinburgh via .

References

Railway stations in Fife
Former North British Railway stations
Railway stations in Great Britain opened in 1847
Railway stations served by ScotRail
1847 establishments in Scotland
Train collisions in Scotland
Railway accidents in 1914
Burntisland